WMEA may refer to:

 WMEA (FM), a radio station (90.1 FM) licensed to Portland, Maine, United States
 WMEA-TV, a television station (channel 36, virtual 26) licensed to Biddeford, Maine, United States
 Wisconsin Music Educators Association